Krylbreen is a glacier in Nathorst Land at Spitsbergen, Svalbard. It has a length of about four kilometers, and extends northwards from the mountain of Krylen, between the mountains of Hisingerfjellet and Wahlenbergfjellet.

References

Glaciers of Spitsbergen